St. Thomas Catholic Church is parish of the Roman Catholic Church in Coeur d'Alene, Idaho. Founded in 1890 to serve the Catholic miners and lumber workers relocating to the area, it remains an active congregation of the Diocese of Boise.

It is noted for its historic parish church, built in 1909 by E. M. Kreig with bricks from Sandpoint, Idaho, with the arch built with sandstones from Tenino, Washington. The building was designed in the Romanesque Revival style by architects Francis P. Rooney and Lewis P. Stritesky, and the stained glass was designed by G. C. Riordan & Company. It has been listed on the National Register of Historic Places since October 5, 1977.

References

External links

National Register of Historic Places in Kootenai County, Idaho
Romanesque Revival church buildings in Idaho
Roman Catholic churches completed in 1909
Churches on the National Register of Historic Places in Idaho
Religious organizations established in 1890
Buildings and structures in Coeur d'Alene, Idaho
20th-century Roman Catholic church buildings in the United States